"To You" is a song by the band Earth, Wind & Fire featuring Brian McKnight, released as a single in 2005 on Sanctuary Records. The song reached No. 16 on the Billboard Adult R&B Songs chart and No. 29 on the Billboard Smooth Jazz Songs chart.

Overview
To You was produced and composed by Brian McKnight. The song also came from Earth, Wind & Fire's 2005 album Illumination.

Critical reception
Rob Theakston of Allmusic stated that Brian McKnight makes an "eloquent appearance" on the song.

References

2005 singles
Earth, Wind & Fire songs
Brian McKnight songs
2005 songs
Songs written by Brian McKnight